Legislative elections were held in France on 2 and 6 March 1839. Only citizens paying taxes were eligible to vote.

Results

Aftermath
Louis-Philippe of France did not have a majority and dissolved the legislature on 16 June 1842.

References

Legislative elections in France
France
Legislative
France